The Medal of Valor (Itur HaGvura) is the highest Israeli military decoration.

The medal was established in 1970 by the Knesset in an act of law as a replacement for the Hero of Israel military decoration that was awarded during the 1947-48 Civil War in Mandatory Palestine and the 1948 Arab–Israeli War. Awards of the medal were also made for actions prior to 1970, and all recipients of the Hero of Israel automatically received the Medal of Valor as well.

Recipients of the medal receive several privileges such as a tax reduction and invitations to official state ceremonies.

To this day, 40 medals have been awarded: 12 for actions in the War of Independence (Hero of Israel recipients automatically received the Medal of Valor), four for the Sinai War, 12 for the Six-Day War, one for the War of Attrition, eight for the Yom Kippur War, and three others for actions during specific operations.

Design 
The medal was designed by Dan Reisinger in the shape of a Star of David.
A sword and olive branch decorate the left side, while the reverse is plain. The medal is attached to a yellow ribbon, a reference to the yellow star that Jews were forced to wear during the Holocaust. Two time recipients of the medal attach a small medal-shaped clasp to the ribbon.

The medal is minted by the Israel Government Coins and Medals Corporation. It is made of 25 gram silver/935 and the clasp is chrome plated.

Recipients

References 

 John D. Clarke, Gallantry Medals & Awards of the World, p. 108

Military awards and decorations of Israel
Awards established in 1970
1970 establishments in Israel